Boulder Canyon is an unincorporated area and census-designated place (CDP) in Lawrence County, South Dakota, United States. The population was 561 at the 2020 census. It was first listed as a CDP prior to the 2020 census.

It is in the eastern part of the county, on the northern edge of the Black Hills. It sits at the head of Boulder Canyon, formed by Bear Butte Creek, which drains northeast to the Great Plains. U.S. Route 14A runs through the community, leading northeast down the canyon  to Sturgis and west  to Deadwood.

Demographics

References 

Census-designated places in Lawrence County, South Dakota
Census-designated places in South Dakota